STYLEPIT, previously known as SmartGuy Group is an online retailer of fashion apparel, launched in 2000. STYLEPIT has been named a growth gazelle by Danish business daily Børsen for six consecutive years, and has received a number of awards, including the Danish e-Commerce Award, as well as European e-Commerce Awards.

In addition to Denmark, the company has local offices or actual subsidiaries in 20 European markets.   Bestseller acquired 10% of the shares, when the company became quoted on the Danish stock exchange Nasdaq OMX in late 2012. One year later, Bestseller increased their ownership to 26%. In January 2014, STYLEPIT moved their warehouse to Szczecin, Poland.

See also

References

External links 
 Official webpage 

Online clothing retailers
Online retailers of Denmark
Retail companies based in Copenhagen
Clothing companies established in 2000
Retail companies established in 2000
Internet properties established in 2000
Clothing companies of Denmark
Companies based in Copenhagen Municipality